The Fuchs Bakery is a historic bakery in Homestead, Florida. It is located at 102 South Krome Avenue. On November 15, 1996, it was added to the U.S. National Register of Historic Places.

This property is part of the Homestead Multiple Property Submission, a Multiple Property Submission to the National Register.

In late 2017 early 2018 the building was torn down to make way for a new Cinema entertainment complex.

References
  1212121212

External links

 Dade County listings at National Register of Historic Places
 Fuchs Bakery at Florida's Office of Cultural and Historical Programs

Bakeries of the United States
National Register of Historic Places in Miami-Dade County, Florida
Homestead, Florida